Edward Williams was a footballer who played for Burslem Port Vale at the start of the 20th century.

Career
Williams played for East Vale before joining Burslem Port Vale as an amateur in February 1903. He played just five Second Division games in the 1904–05 season, and probably left the Athletic Ground in the summer of 1905.

Career statistics
Source:

References

Year of birth missing
Year of death missing
English footballers
Association football forwards
Port Vale F.C. players
English Football League players